This is a list of sportspeople who have moved to compete for another country. Not included in this list are:
Players who could choose to play for a new country after the dissolution of their former country. This mainly affected players from the former Soviet Union, such as Viktor Onopko, and the former Yugoslavia, such as Davor Šuker.
Players who represented the country they moved to in childhood. Frequently, the home countries of such players are former colonies of their future countries (such as Patrick Vieira, born in Senegal but moved to France in childhood). Another example of such a player was Marcel Desailly, a Ghana-born player who was adopted in childhood by a French diplomat and raised in France.
Players who could have chosen to represent another country due to their birthplace, parentage, ancestry (i.e., at least one grandparent), and/or residence. Some notable examples:
Former England international Owen Hargreaves's birth in Canada made him eligible for that country, he was eligible to play for England through his father and Wales through his mother, and his residence in Germany would have made him eligible for that country also.
Former German international Kevin Kurányi, who chose Germany (parentage) over Brazil (birthplace), Panama (parentage) and Hungary (ancestry).
Former USA international Earnie Stewart, who chose the USA (parentage) over the Netherlands (birthplace and parentage).
However, players who actually represented one country, either at junior or senior level, before representing a second country are included, even if they qualify by ancestry. For example:
In football, Nigel Quashie represented England at U-21 level, but qualified for Scotland via his Scottish grandfather, and played for the Scotland senior side.
In rugby union, Diego Domínguez played for Argentina at senior level before playing for Italy, for which he qualified via a grandparent. Similarly, Clyde Rathbone represented South Africa at U-21 level before opting for Australia at senior level, and Isaac Boss represented New Zealand at U-19 level before choosing Ireland at senior level; both also qualified for their new countries via a grandparent. Daniel Vickerman represented South Africa at U21 level, but then went on to play 63 times for Australia, including two Rugby World Cup finals.

Alpine skiing

Archery

Athletics

Auto racing

Badminton

Baseball

Basketball
See also List of naturalized basketball players

Biathlon

Bobsleigh

Boxing

Bridge
Parenthetical date spans such as (1935–1937) or (1935–1935) report first and last representative appearances in World and European championship tournaments, according to the World Bridge Federation and European Bridge League shared database (WBF People Finder or EBL Player Lookup). This list does not cover, say, US immigrant participation in United States Bridge Championships competition to determine US representatives—so to speak, transfers of national eligibility not consummated by play as national representatives.

Single dates imply one known representative international appearance, such as one-time play in the now-biennial Bermuda Bowl tournament.

Canoeing

Chess
See List of nationality transfers in chess

Cricket

Only those who played for more than one International Cricket Council (ICC) member are listed.

 Andri Berenger is the only cricketer to play for 3 countries (SL-U19, UAE and Qatar)

Cross-country skiing

Cue sports

Cycling

Diving

Draughts

Equestrianism

Fencing

Figure skating

Football (soccer)

Women's football (soccer)

Golf

Gymnastics

Handball

Ice hockey
Until German courts were forced to rule on the eligibility of Miroslav Sikora in 1987, it was forbidden to compete for more than one nation in IIHF events.

Men's ice hockey

* = Only represented this nation at the Canada Cup or World Cup of Hockey and did not affect IIHF or Olympic eligibility
^ = Eligibility contested in only appearance

Women's ice hockey

Judo

Karate

Lacrosse

Lawn Bowls

Luge

Motorcycling

Netball

Nordic combined

Pool and snooker

Rowing

Rugby League

Rugby Union

Sailing

Shooting

Short track speed skating

Skeleton

Ski jumping

Ski orienteering

Snowboarding

Softball

Speed skating

Squash

Surfing

Swimming

Table tennis

Taekwondo

Omar Salim from USA represented Hungary.

Tennis

Volleyball

Water polo

Weightlifting

Wrestling

Multiple sports

See also
 List of sportspeople with dual nationality
 Grannygate

Notes

Nationality transfers in sport